Little Strickland is a small village and civil parish in the Eden district of Cumbria, England. The village has one place of worship and a telephone box. The population of the civil parish as taken at the 2011 Census was less than 100. Details are included in the parish of Great Strickland. On 1 April 2019 Thrimby parish was merged with Little Strickland.

Transport 

Nearby settlements 
Nearby settlements include Penrith, Appleby-in-Westmorland, the villages of Great Strickland, Newby, Hackthorpe, Sleagill and Shap and the hamlets of Thrimby and Sweetholme.

See also

Listed buildings in Little Strickland

References

External links

 Cumbria County History Trust: Little Strickland (nb: provisional research only – see Talk page)
 http://www.thecumbriadirectory.com/Town_or_Village/location.php?url=little_strickland

 
Villages in Cumbria
Civil parishes in Cumbria
Eden District